This page lists board and card games, wargames, miniatures games, and tabletop role-playing games published in 2018.  For video games, see 2018 in video gaming.

Games released or invented in 2018
The Binding of Isaac: Four Souls
The Devil's Level card game
Dominaria (a Magic the Gathering set)
Everdell
Heroes of Land, Air & Sea
Just One
KeyForge
The Quacks of Quedlinburg
Rising Sun
Root
Star Wars: X-Wing Second Edition
Take the Galaxy

Game awards given in 2018
 Lisboa won the Spiel Portugal Jogo do Ano.

Significant games-related events in 2018

Deaths

See also
List of game manufacturers
2018 in video gaming

References

Games
Games by year